Alexander González Moreno (born 14 December 1994) is a Panamanian professional footballer who plays for San Miguelito as a midfielder.

Club career

Pacific FC
On 17 May 2019, González signed with Canadian Premier League side Pacific FC. On 23 May 2019, he made his debut for Pacific in a 2–1 loss to Cavalry FC in the Canadian Championship.

San Miguelito
On 29 January 2020, González signed with Liga Panameña side Sporting San Miguelito.

International career
González debuted with the Panama national team in a friendly 1-0 win over Costa Rica on 10 October 2020.

Career statistics

A.  The "Other" column includes appearances and goals in the Liga Panameña de Fútbol Playoffs.

Honours
Plaza Amador
Liga Panameña de Fútbol Clausura: 2015–16

References

External links

1994 births
Living people
Association football midfielders
Panamanian footballers
Panama international footballers
Panama youth international footballers
Panamanian expatriate footballers
Expatriate footballers in Venezuela
Panamanian expatriate sportspeople in Venezuela
Expatriate footballers in Colombia
Panamanian expatriate sportspeople in Colombia
Expatriate soccer players in Canada
Panamanian expatriate sportspeople in Canada
Sporting San Miguelito players
C.D. Plaza Amador players
Aragua FC players
Jaguares de Córdoba footballers
Pacific FC players
Liga Panameña de Fútbol players
Venezuelan Primera División players
Categoría Primera A players
Canadian Premier League players